The English pronouns form a relatively small category of words in Modern English whose primary semantic function is that of a pro-form for a noun phrase. Traditional grammars consider them to be a distinct part of speech, while most modern grammars see them as a subcategory of noun, contrasting with common and proper nouns. Still others see them as a subcategory of determiner (see the DP hypothesis). In this article, they are treated as a subtype of the noun category.

They clearly include personal pronouns, relative pronouns, interrogative pronouns, and reciprocal pronouns. Other types that are included by some grammars but excluded by others are demonstrative pronouns and indefinite pronouns. Other members are disputed (see below).

Overview

Forms

Standard 
Pronouns in formal modern English .

Full list 
Those types that are indisputably pronouns are the personal pronouns, relative pronouns, interrogative pronouns, and reciprocal pronouns. The full set is presented in the following table along with dummy there. Nonstandard, informal and archaic forms are in italics.

*Whom and which can be the object of a fronted preposition, but not who, that or an omitted (Ø) pronoun: The chair on which she sat or The chair (that) she sat on, but not *The chair on that she sat.

†Except in free or fused relative constructions, in which case what, whatever or whichever is used for a thing and whoever or whomever is used for a person: What he did was clearly impossible, Whoever you married is welcome here (see below).

Distinguishing characteristics

Pro-forms 
Pronoun is a category of words. A pro-form is not. It is a meaning relation in which a phrase "stands in" for (expresses the same content as) another where the meaning is recoverable from the context. In English, pronouns mostly function as pro-forms, but there are pronouns that are not pro-forms and pro-forms that are not pronouns.

Examples [1 & 2] are pronouns and pro-forms. In [1], the pronoun it "stands in" for whatever was mentioned and is a good idea. In [2], the relative pronoun who stands in for "the people".

Examples [3 & 4] are pronouns but not pro-forms. In [3], the interrogative pronoun who doesn't stand in for anything. Similarly, in [4], it is a dummy pronoun, one that doesn't stand in for anything. No other word can function there with the same meaning; we don't say "the sky is raining" or "the weather is raining".

Finally, in [5 & 6], there are pro-forms that are not pronouns. In [5], did so is a verb phrase, but it stands in for "help". Similarly, in [6], others is a common noun, not a pronoun, but the others stands in for this list of names of the other people involved (e.g., Sho, Alana, and Ali).

Pronouns can be pro-forms for non-noun phrases. For example, in I fixed the bike, which was quite a challenge, the relative pronoun which doesn't stand in for "the bike". Instead, it stands in for the entire proposition "I fixed the bike", a clause, or arguably "fixing the bike", a verb phrase.

Deixis 
Most pronouns are deictic: they have no inherent denotation, and their meaning is always contextual. For example, the meaning of me depends entirely on who says it, just as the meaning of you depends on who is being addressed. Pronouns are not the only deictic words though. For example now is deictic, but it's not a pronoun. Also, dummy pronouns and interrogative pronouns are not deictic. In contrast, most noun phrases headed by common or proper nouns are not deictic. For example, a book typically has the same denotation regardless of the situation in which it is said.

Syntactic functions 
English pronouns have all of the functions of other noun phrases:

On top of this, pronouns can appear in interrogative tags (e.g., that's the one, isn't it?). These tags are formed with an auxiliary verb and a pronoun. Other nouns cannot appear in this construction. This provides justification for categorizing dummy there as a pronoun.

Subjects 
Subject pronouns are typically in nominative form (e.g., She works here.), though independent genitives are also possible (e.g., Hers is better.). In non-finite clauses, however, there is more variety. In present participial clauses, the nominative, accusative, and dependent genitive are all possible:

 Nominative: Some people, I being one of them, are just not good at it.
 Accusative: Him getting bullied doesn't make him weak.
 Dependent genitive: It worked without our having to do anything at all.

In infinitival clauses, accusative case pronouns function as the subject:

 Accusative: It's not easy for me to change.

Object 
Object pronouns are typically in nominative form (e.g., I saw him.) but may also be reflexive (e.g., She saw herself) or independent genitive (e.g., We got ours.).

Object of a preposition 
The pronoun object of a preposition is typically in the accusative form but may also be reflexive (e.g., She sent it to herself) or independent genitive (e.g., I hadn't heard of theirs.). With but, than, and as in a very formal register, nominative is also possible (e.g., You're taller than me/I.)

Predicative complement 
A pronoun in predicative complement position is typically in the accusative form (e.g., It's me) but may also be reflexive (e.g., She isn't herself today) or independent genitive (e.g., It's theirs.).

Determinative 
Only genitive pronouns may function as determinatives.

Adjunct 
The most common form for adjuncts is the reflexive (e.g., I did it myself). Independent genitives and accusative are also possible (e.g.,  Only one matters, mine/me.).

Dependents 
Like proper nouns, but unlike common nouns, pronouns usually resist dependents. They are not always ungrammatical, but they are quite limited in their use:

Examples marked with an asterisk are ungrammatical.

Undisputed subtypes

Personal 

Personal pronouns are those that participate in the grammatical and semantic systems of person (1st, 2nd, & 3rd person). It's not that they refer to people. They typically form definite NPs.

The personal pronouns of modern standard English are presented in the table above. They are I, you, she, he, it, we, and they, and their inflected forms.

The second-person you forms are used with both singular and plural reference. In the Southern United States, y'all (from you all) is used as a plural form, and various other phrases such as you guys are used in other places. An archaic set of second-person pronouns used for singular reference is thou, thee, thyself, thy, thine, which are still used in religious services and can be seen in older works, such as Shakespeare's—in such texts, ye and the you set of pronouns are used for plural reference, or with singular reference as a formal V-form. You can also be used as an indefinite pronoun, referring to a person in general (see generic you), compared to the more formal alternative, one (reflexive oneself, possessive one's).

The third-person singular forms are differentiated according to the gender of the referent. For example, she is used to refer to a female person, sometimes a female animal, and sometimes an object to which female characteristics are attributed, such as a ship or a country. A male person, and sometimes a male animal, is referred to using he. In other cases it can be used. (See Gender in English.)

The third-person form they is used with both plural and singular referents. Historically, singular they was restricted to quantificational constructions such as Each employee should clean their desk and referential cases where the referent's gender was unknown. However, it is increasingly used when the referent's gender is irrelevant or when the referent is neither male nor female.

The dependent genitive pronouns, such as my, are used as determinatives together with nouns, as in my old man, some of his friends. The independent genitive forms like mine are used as full noun phrases (e.g., mine is bigger than yours; this one is mine). Note also the construction a friend of mine (meaning "someone who is my friend"). See English possessive for more details.

Interrogative 
The interrogative pronouns are who, whom, whose, which and what (also with the suffix -ever). They are chiefly used in interrogative clauses for the speech act of asking questions. What has impersonal gender, while who, whom and whose have personal gender; they are used to refer to persons. Whom is the accusative form of who (though in most contexts this is replaced by who), while whose is the genitive form. For more information see who.

All the interrogative pronouns can also be used as relative pronouns, though what is quite limited in its use; see below for more details.

Relative 

The main relative pronouns in English are who (with its derived forms whom and whose), and which.

The relative pronoun which refers to things rather than persons, as in the shirt, which used to be red, is faded. For persons, who is used (the man who saw me was tall). The oblique case form of who is whom, as in the man whom I saw was tall, although in informal registers who is commonly used in place of whom.

The possessive form of who is whose (for example, the man whose car is missing); however the use of whose is not restricted to persons (one can say an idea whose time has come).

The word that is disputed. Traditionally, it is considered a pronoun, but modern approaches disagree. See below.

The word what can be used to form a free relative clause – one that has no antecedent and that serves as a complete noun phrase in itself, as in I like what he likes. The words whatever and whichever can be used similarly, in the role of either pronouns (whatever he likes) or determiners (whatever book he likes). When referring to persons, who(ever) (and whom(ever)) can be used in a similar way (but not as determiners).

Generic 
A generic pronoun is one with the interpretation of "a person in general". These pronouns cannot have a definite or specific referent, and they "cannot be used as an anaphor to another NP." The generic pronouns are one (e.g., one can see oneself in the mirror) and you (e.g., In Tokugawa Japan, you couldn't leave the country), with one being more formal than you.

Reciprocal 
The English reciprocal pronouns are each other and one another. Although they are written with a space, they're best thought of as single words. No consistent distinction in meaning or use can be found between them. Like the reflexive pronouns, their use is limited to contexts where an antecedent precedes it. In the case of the reciprocals, they need to appear in the same clause as the antecedent.

Disputed pronouns

Determiners 

Today, the English determiners are generally seen as a separate category of words, but they were traditionally viewed as adjectives when they came before a noun (e.g., some people, no books, each book) and as pronouns when they were pro-forms (e.g., I'll have some; I had none, each of the books).

What and which 
As pronouns, what and which have non-personal gender. This means they cannot be used to refer to persons; what is that cannot mean "who is that". But there are also determiners with the same forms. The determiners are not gendered, so they can refer to persons or non-persons (e.g., what genius said that).

Relative which is usually a pronoun, but it can be a determiner in cases like It may rain, in which case we won't go. What is almost never a relative word, but when it is, it is a pronoun (e.g., I didn't see what you took.)

Demonstratives 
The demonstrative pronouns this (plural these), and that (plural those), are a sub-type of determiner in English. Traditionally, they are viewed as pronouns in cases such as these are good; I like that.

Indefinites 
The determiners starting with some-, any, no, and every- and ending with -one, -body, -thing, -place (e.g., someone, nothing) are often called indefinite pronouns, though others consider them to be compound determiners.

The generic pronouns one and the generic use of you are sometimes called indefinite. These are uncontroversial pronouns. Note, however, that English has three words that share the spelling and pronunciation of one.

 determiner: I have one book; I'll have one too.
 noun: one plus two is three
 pronoun: if one considers oneself correct

Dummy there 
The word there is a dummy pronoun in some clauses, chiefly existential (There is no god) and presentational constructions (There appeared a cat on the window sill). The dummy subject takes the number (singular or plural) of the logical subject (complement), hence it takes a plural verb if the complement is plural. In informal English, however, the contraction there's is often used for both singular and plural.

There can undergo inversion, Is there a test today? and Never has there been a man such as this. It can also appear without a corresponding logical subject, in short sentences and question tags: There wasn't a discussion, was there?

The word there in such sentences has sometimes been analyzed as an adverb, or as a dummy predicate, rather than as a pronoun. However, its identification as a pronoun is most consistent with its behavior in inverted sentences and question tags as described above.

Because the word there can also be a deictic adverb (meaning "at that place"), a sentence like There is a river could have either of two meanings: "a river exists" (with there as a pronoun), and "a river is in that place" (with there as an adverb). In speech, the adverbial there would be given stress, while the pronoun would not – in fact, the pronoun is often pronounced as a weak form, .

Yesterday, today, and tomorrow 
These words are sometimes classified as nouns (e.g., Tomorrow should be a nice day), and sometimes as adverbs (I'll see you tomorrow). But they are alternatively classified as pronouns in both of these examples. In fact, these words have most of the characteristics of pronouns (see above). In particular, they are pro-forms, and they resist most dependents (e.g., *a good today).

Relative that 
Traditional grammars classify that as a relative pronoun. Most modern grammars disagree, calling it a subordinator or a complementizer.

Relative that is normally found only in restrictive relative clauses (unlike which and who, which can be used in both restrictive and unrestrictive clauses). It can refer to either persons or things, and cannot follow a preposition. For example, one can say the song that [or which] I listened to yesterday, but the song to which [not to that] I listened yesterday. Relative that is usually pronounced with a reduced vowel (schwa), and hence differently from the demonstrative that (see Weak and strong forms in English). If that is not the subject of the relative clause (in the traditional view), it can be omitted (the song I listened to yesterday).

Other pro-forms 
There is some confusion about the difference between a pronoun and a pro-form. For example, some sources make claims such as the following:We can use other as a pronoun. As a pronoun, other has a plural form, others:
We have to solve this problem, more than any other, today
I’ll attach two photos to this email and I’ll send others tomorrow.But other is just a common noun here. Unlike pronouns, it readily takes a determiner (many others) or a relative clause modifier (others that we know).

Old English

Interrogative pronouns 
Hwā ("who") and hwæt ("what") follow natural gender, not grammatical gender: as in Modern English, hwā is used with people, hwæt with things. However, that distinction only matters in the nominative and accusative cases, as they are identical in other cases:

Hwelċ ("which" or "what kind of") is inflected like an adjective. Same with hwæðer, which also means "which" but is only used between two alternatives:

Personal pronouns 
The first- and second-person pronouns are the same for all genders. They also have special dual forms, which are only used for groups of two things, as in "we both" and "you two." The dual forms are common, but the ordinary plural forms can always be used instead when the meaning is clear.

Many of the forms above bear a strong resemblance to the Modern English words they eventually became. For instance, in the genitive case, ēower became "your," ūre became "our," and mīn became "my." However, the plural third-person personal pronouns were all replaced with Old Norse forms during the Middle English period, yielding "they," "them," and "their."

Middle English 
Middle English personal pronouns were mostly developed from those of Old English, with the exception of the third-person plural, a borrowing from Old Norse (the original Old English form clashed with the third person singular and was eventually dropped). Also, the nominative form of the feminine third-person singular was replaced by a form of the demonstrative that developed into sche (modern she), but the alternative heyr remained in some areas for a long time.

As with nouns, there was some inflectional simplification (the distinct Old English dual forms were lost), but pronouns, unlike nouns, retained distinct nominative and accusative forms. Third-person pronouns also retained a distinction between accusative and dative forms, but that was gradually lost: the masculine hine was replaced by him south of the Thames by the early 14th century, and the neuter dative him was ousted by it in most dialects by the 15th.

The following table shows some of the various Middle English pronouns. Many other variations are noted in Middle English sources because of differences in spellings and pronunciations at different times and in different dialects.

References

Works cited
  

English pronouns